Hendrabridge is a hamlet in the parish of Menheniot, Cornwall, England. It is in the civil parish of Dobwalls and Trewidland.

References

Hamlets in Cornwall